Sophie Verrijn Stuart (1890–1946) was a Dutch ceramicist.

Biography
Verrijn Stuart was born on 18 April 1890 in Amsterdam. She studied at Kunstnijverheidsschool Quellinus (Amsterdam) where she was a student of Bert Nienhuis. She worked as a potter in Amsterdam from 1926 until her death.

In 1925 Verrijn Stuart won an honorable mention at International Exhibition of Modern Decorative and Industrial Arts in Paris. Verrijn Stuart was a member of Nederlandsche Vereeniging voor Ambachts- en Nijverheidskunst (V.A.N.K.) the Dutch Association for Craft and Craft Art.

Verrijn Stuart died on 	14 August 1946 in Amsterdam. Her work is in the collection of the Stedelijk Museum Amsterdam and the Kunstmuseum Den Haag.

References

External links
images of Verrijn Stuart's work at the Stedelijk Museum Amsterdam

1890 births
1946 deaths
Artists from Amsterdam
Dutch women artists
Dutch potters